The 14th Santosham Film Awards is an awards ceremony held at Hyderabad, India on 14 August 2016 recognized the best films and performances from the Tollywood films and music released in 2015, along with special honors for lifetime contributions and a few special awards. The awards are annually presented by Santosham magazine.

Honorary Awards 

 Santosham Award for Completing 25 Years in Cinema – Malashri
 Santosham Allu Ramalingaiah Smarakam Award – Prudhvi Raj
 Santosham Akkineni Nageswara Rao Smarakam Award – Murali Mohan
 Santosham Daggubati Ramanaidu Smarakam Award – Editor Mohan

Main Awards

Film

Music

Special Awards 

 Ever Green Beauty of India – Jaya Prada
 Special Jury Award for Best Actress – Hansika Motwani
 Special Jury Award for Best Actress – Pranitha Subhash
 Special Jury Award – Sivaji Raja
 Best New Face – Nikki Galrani
 Santosham Best Photographer Award – Tata Mallesh for Baahubali: The Beginning (2015)

Presenters

Performers 

 Lavanya Tripathi
 Surbhi Puranik
 Hebah Patel
 Rashmi Gautam

References 

2016 Indian film awards
Santosham Film Awards